Aadi Velli is a 1990 Indian Tamil-language film directed by Rama Narayanan and produced by N.Radha, starring Seetha and Nizhalgal Ravi. The film was remade in Kannada as Durgasthami.

Plot

Aadi Velli (a Friday on one of the months as per Tamil Calendar) is a Tamil devotional movie in which a snake and an elephant plays key roles, assisting heroine to over come the attacks posed by her villainous husband.

The story revolves around a beautiful village girl Seetha who is living with an elephant and a cobra who obey only to her. She is very much attracted and attached to the local village deity and she lives in nearby area around the temple. Then comes the villain Nizhalgal Ravi who wants to abduct all the wealth of the temple. He meets Seetha and was attracted to her at the first sight. He befriends her and makes her to love him too under circumstances but always disliked by the elephant and cobra. Very soon Seetha realizes that her  husband is a thief and shocked. Meanwhile, Nizhalgal Ravi along with his computer genius friend plots several attempts to plunder the jewels and precious items from the temple but goes all in vain, saved by the duo. In the climax, the genius friend builds a devil creature called [King Kattari] using his computer to loot the temple. The cobra, by the deity's blessing takes the size of huge anaconda and charges against King Kattari. Meanwhile, during the fight Nizhalgal Ravi realizes his friend plans to loot all properties himself and kill him.
Finally the cobra bites the devil and kills him, which in turn kills the computer genius through electro-envenomation.

Cast

Soundtrack
Soundtrack was composed by Shankar–Ganesh.

Reception
People of south India flocked the theatres running the film to feel the effect of "computer technology Vs holiness".

References

External links

1990 films
1990s Tamil-language films
Films directed by Rama Narayanan
Hindu devotional films
Films scored by Shankar–Ganesh
Tamil films remade in other languages
Films about snakes
Films about elephants